Roundel F.C. was a football club based in Darnall, South Yorkshire in England

History 
The club competed in the FA Cup in the early 1900s.

League and cup history 

* League play-off winners

Honours

League 

 Hatchard League
 Champions: 1899–1900, 1901–02

Cup 
 Sheffield & Hallamshire Senior Cup
 Runners-up: 1902–03

Records 
 Best FA Cup performance: Second qualifying round, 1901–02

References 

Defunct football clubs in South Yorkshire
Defunct football clubs in England
Hatchard League
Sheffield Association League